Santuzza is an unincorporated community in Lewis County, in the U.S. state of Missouri.

History
A post office called Santuzza was established in 1899, and remained in operation until 1902. It is unknown why the name Santuzza was applied to the community.

References

Unincorporated communities in Lewis County, Missouri
Unincorporated communities in Missouri